Shivini, also known as Siuini, Artinis, Ardinis, was a solar god in the mythology of the Iron Age kingdom of Urartu in the Armenian Highlands. He is the third god in a triad with Khaldi and Theispas. The Assyrian god Shamash is a counterpart to Shivini. He was depicted as a man on his knees, holding up a solar disc. His wife was most likely a goddess called Tushpuea who is listed as the third goddess on the Mheri-Dur inscription.

Armen Petrosyan and other scholars argue that his name derives from a Hittite source, and is, therefore, of Indo-European origin.

Gallery

Footnotes

References

Further reading
 Badalyan, Miqayel. "Šiuini: The Urartian Sun God." In Over the Mountains and Far Away: Studies in Near Eastern History and Archaeology Presented to Mirjo Salvini on the Occasion of His 80th Birthday, edited by Avetisyan Pavel S., Dan Roberto, and Grekyan Yervand H., 46-57. Summertown: Archaeopress, 2019. doi:10.2307/j.ctvndv9f0.10.

Urartian deities
Solar gods